Irving B. Harris (August 4, 1910 – September 25, 2004) was an American businessman and philanthropist. With his brother Neison, he co-founded the Toni Home Permanent Company, which was sold to the Gillette Safety Razor Co. in January 1948 for $12.6 million.  The original Toni manufacturing facility was located in a former schoolhouse near Forest Lake, Minnesota.

Early life 

Born and raised in Saint Paul, Minnesota, Harris did much of his charitable work in Chicago, Illinois, but he also donated substantially to the arts in Aspen, Colorado. Harris contributed most of his money to programs for children and the arts such as the Joan W. and Irving B. Harris Theater for Music and Dance. He attended Yale University and graduated Phi Beta Kappa in 1931.

Philanthropy 
In 1986, Harris gave a donation that established The Irving B. Harris Graduate School of Public Policy Studies at The University of Chicago. Mr. Harris gave the lead gift in 1954 to create public television station WTTW in Chicago - he later served as the station's Chairman of the Board.

His philanthropy created several non-profits in Chicago - Family Focus (with Bernice Weissbourd) and the Ounce of Prevention Fund are "children" of Irving Harris, as is Erikson Institute, the graduate school in child development he helped found in 1966.

Personal life 
Harris published a book, Children in Jeopardy, in 1996. Harris had a second wife named Joan; Children with his first wife, Rosetta Wolpert Harris (b 1910 Minneapolis, MN) - two daughters, Roxanne Harris Meyer Frank and Virginia Harris Polsky, as well as a son, William Wolpert Harris. Harris is also the grandfather of noted New York City restaurateur Danny Meyer, son of Roxanne Harris Meyer Frank.

See also 

 Harris School of Public Policy
 Pritzker family
 James Crown
 David G. Booth

References

External links
 The University of Chicago Harris School of Public Policy Web site
 Erikson Institute Web site
 Irving Harris Bio
 WHI Family Office Website

1910 births
2004 deaths
Businesspeople from Saint Paul, Minnesota
Yale University alumni
20th-century American philanthropists
20th-century American businesspeople